Ambience is The Lambrettas' second album. Unlike their first album Beat Boys in the Jet Age, it was not a success. The band had tried to move on from their power pop sound but failed to attract a wider audience. The album includes singles "Good Times" and "Decent Town".

Reception
AllMusic gave the album a rating of 3 stars out of 5, with a review by Chris Woodstra: "As the mod revival was running out of steam, the band took a step away from the sound for a more mature and varied album. No longer is their main concern motor scooters, girls, and living for today as evident in the haunting "Good Times" and "Decent Town". Though it failed commercially, Ambience is a fine collection of Brit-pop worth seeking out."

Track listing

"Good Times" (Jez Bird, Doug Sanders) - 3:59
"Written to Neon" (Bird) - 3:27
"Total Strangers" (Bird, Sanders) - 4:13
"Concrete and Steel" (Bird) - 4:09
"Dancing in the Dark" (Bird) - 2:45
"Decent Town" (Sanders) - 4:02
"Ambience" (Bird, Sanders) - 3:14
"Men in Blue" (Bird) - 4:43
"I Want to Tell You" (George Harrison) - 2:33
"Someone Talking" (Bird, Sanders) - 4:59

Personnel

Jez Bird – vocals, guitar
Doug Sanders – guitar, vocals
Mark Ellis – bass
Stephen Bray – percussion
with:
Wesley Magoogan – saxophone

Production/Engineering
Steve James – producer
Robin Heggie – engineer
Craig Thompson – engineer

Graphics
Keith McEwan – art direction and design
Brian Burrows – sleeve remix (on CD reissue)

References

1981 albums
The Lambrettas albums
Albums produced by Peter Collins (record producer)
The Rocket Record Company albums